"I Confess" is a 1982 song written and recorded by the Beat (known in the United States and Canada as the English Beat). The song was released as a single from the band's third and final studio album, Special Beat Service, finding moderate chart success in the UK. Inspired by the romantic escapades of English tabloids and Wakeling's own personal relationships, the song featured a piano performance led by touring keyboardist Dave "Blockhead" Wright.

As the album's third single, "I Confess" found moderate success on the charts, peaking at No. 54 in the UK. The song was praised by critics. A music video for the track was also produced, featuring the band's parody of the New Romantics.

Background
Lyrically, "I Confess" was a mix of Beat frontman Dave Wakeling's personal experiences and sensationalized stories that he had read in magazines. Wakeling had been a frequent reader of these magazines; he recalled, "At the same time, I had a bit of an obsession with what was called 'Photo Love' in England. They were those teen magazines where they had photographs with bubbles coming out of their mouths. Broken hearts and redemption, that sort of thing. I loved the cloying, hyper-driven emotion of them, and I'd had my photograph as a pin-up in a couple of them". Wakeling then connected his "own tawdry tales of young love" with a tabloid story about a man who "had been caught having sex with his new bride's sister on their wedding day".

Musically, the song had originated from a riff composed by Beat touring keyboardist Dave "Blockhead" Wright. Wright had filled in for Beat saxophonist Saxa and introduced a piano part he had composed to Wakeling. Wakeling explained,

Wakeling compared David Steele's bass part to Chic.

Release and reception
"I Confess" was released as the third single from Special Beat Service (1982), with "Sole Salvation" on the B-side. The single peaked at number 54 on the UK Singles Chart. AllMusic's Stewart Mason pointed to the song's atypical lyrics and musical style as off-putting for some Beat fans, leading to a level of skepticism toward the song. In the US, the track went to number 34 on the Billboard Dance/Disco Top 80 chart.

"I Confess" has seen positive critical reception since its release. Mason said of the track, "It's actually a startlingly well-constructed song, as well as one of the group's most unforgettable singles", while fellow AllMusic writer Jo-Ann Greene praised its "Joe Jackson-esque piano line".

In a 1982 interview, Elvis Costello praised the song as "one of the most beautiful bits of singing I've heard all year". Wakeling had previously named Costello's "Secondary Modern" as one of his all-time top ten favorite songs.

Music video
The song's single release was accompanied by a music video. Wakeling recalled that the video satirized the "New Romantic" style that had been gaining in popularity during the early 1980s. He explained,

References

External links
 

1982 songs
1982 singles
The Beat (British band) songs
Song recordings produced by Bob Sargeant